The 1921–22 Kangaroo tour of Great Britain was the third ever Kangaroo tour. Again an Australasian side rather than an Australian team alone (although the 28-man squad featured only one New Zealander) travelled to Great Britain to contest the Ashes. Coached by Arthur Hennessy and captained by Les Cubitt, the Kangaroos travelled on the RMS Tahiti to England for best-of-three series of Test matches against Great Britain for the Ashes. The tour took place during the 1921–22 Northern Rugby Football Union season and also featured matches against several of the clubs in that competition as well as other representative teams. The tour also involved some degree of player misbehaviour, with one young footballer almost sent home from San Francisco because of all the broken glasses following a drinking session on board the team's ship.

Touring squad
During 1921, the New Zealand side toured Australia, playing matches against New South Wales and Queensland, which served as selection trials for the upcoming 'Australasian' team's tour, for which only one New Zealander, Bert Laing, selected. The team wore the sky blue jersey of New South Wales and the only non-New South Welsh player to appear in a test was Queenslander Billy Richards in the third.

Billy Cann was co-manager of the Australasian touring squad along with Souths' secretary, George Ball. Secretary of the Queensland Rugby League, and football journalist Harry Sunderland also accompanied the team.

On this tour Sandy Pearce at 38 years of age became the oldest Australian international player.

New South Wales
Early in the 1921 NSWRFL season, players who were selected had to leave their clubs for the tour. All but one of the League's nine teams (University) were represented in the touring squad:

Cec Blinkhorn, three-quarter back for North Sydney
Frank Burge, forward for Glebe
Harry Caples, half back for Eastern Suburbs
George Carstairs, back for St. George
Jimmy Craig, three-quarter back for Balmain
(c) Les Cubitt, three-quarter back for Eastern Suburbs
Charles Fraser, back for Balmain
Bert Gray, forward for Glebe
Harold Horder, three-quarter back for North Sydney
Clarrie Ives, forward for North Sydney
Albert Johnston, half back for St. George
Reg Latta, forward for Balmain

Ted McGrath, forward for South Sydney
Rex Norman, three-quarter back for Eastern Suburbs
Sandy Pearce, forward for Eastern Suburbs
Herman Peters, three-quarter back for North Sydney
Clarrie Prentice, forward for Western Suburbs
Felix Ryan, forward for Newtown
Bill Schultz, forward for Balmain
Duncan Thompson, half back for North Sydney
Dick Townsend, forward for Newtown
Dick Vest, three-quarter back for Western Suburbs
Jack Watkins, forward for Eastern Suburbs

Queensland

Neville Broadfoot, three-quarter back for Queensland
Edwin Brown, three-quarter back for Newtown (Toowoomba)

Norm Potter, forward for Queensland
Bill Richards, forward for Western Suburbs (Brisbane)

New Zealand
The sole New Zealand player that accompanied the Australians on tour has been listed in the Australian Rugby League's Kangaroos players register.

Bert Laing, half back for Auckland

Matches
Before sailing for England the team stopped in New Zealand for an exhibition match at the Basin Reserve in Wellington. Also during the tour, the Northern Rugby Football Union tried to arrange a match in Paris, but opposition from the RFU-aligned French Rugby Federation made it impossible.

After arriving in England, the Kangaroos played four matches against local clubs before the first Ashes test, winning all of them with dominant margins:

First Ashes test

The Kangaroos' winning streak came to an end when they played against England. Australasia led 5–3 at the break and the match seemed to be theirs when Frank Burge scored a late try, but it was disallowed by referee Frank Renton. Thus, a sole second-half try from the British close to full-time was enough for them to win it.

At halftime York led 4–3 in a game that "was characterised by rough and scrambling play, minor injuries being numerous."

Second Ashes test

In the second Test the scores were 2-all at half-time, but after that the Australian backline of Horder, Carstairs, Vest and Blinkhorn cut loose. The Kangaroos scored 4 tries to nil, the win setting up the third and final Test as the Ashes decider. This was also the last Test in the international career of Sandy Pearce and made him the oldest ever Kangaroo.

The Kangaroos played sixteen more tour matches between the second and third Tests:

Up to and including the final Kangaroo Tour which included matches against English club sides in 1994, this would be the highest ever score by the Kangaroos. The closest The Kangaroos ever came to this score was an 80–2 win over the Sheffield Eagles in 1994.

Among those present for this match was the UK's Speaker of the House of Commons, J. H. Whitley. The half-time score was 18–3 to the visitors, who were without Dick Vest due to ill health.

Third Ashes test

The decider was played on a heavy, snow-bound field, much to the dismay of the fleet-footed Kangaroos. Early in the match the Australians were reduced to twelve men when Chook Fraser suffered a broken leg. In what was described as "a bruising encounter", Herman Hilton took a pass from his captain, the "prince of centres", Harold Wagstaff to dive over, taking two defenders over the try-line with him. The final score was 6–0 to the home side. By winning this third and deciding test of the series, Britain claimed the Ashes.

By the end of the tour, Australian three-quarter, Cec Blinkhorn, had scored 39 tries in 29 matches, which still stands as the record for most tries scored on a Kangaroo tour. The other winger, Harold Horder scored 35, and forward Frank Burge was not far behind with 33 tries from 23 games.

The team travelled back to Australia on the Orvieto, arriving in Fremantle in February 1922. Upon their return to Sydney a large dinner was held for the tourists by the New South Wales Rugby Football League, which was attended by the likes of Sir Joynton Smith, to celebrate the players' courageous effort and the fact that this was the first team to return to Sydney with a profit.

References

External links
1921–22 Australasian Football Team Touring Great Britain – Souvenir (Melba Studios, Sydney)
Ashes Series 1921/22 at rugbyleagueproject.org

Australia national rugby league team tours
Rugby league tours of Great Britain
Kangaroo tour of Great Britain
Kangaroo tour of Great Britain
Kangaroo tour of Great Britain
Kangaroo tour of Great Britain
Kangaroo tour of Great Britain
Kangaroo tour of Great Britain
Kangaroo tour of Great Britain
Kangaroo tour of Great Britain
Kangaroo tour of Great Britain
Kangaroo tour of Great Britain